Walsall Academy is a secondary school based in Bloxwich, West Midlands, England, Walsall. It opened in January 2003 with 470 students on the roll, and after four years that figure had increased to 1,050 – making it one of the most populated secondary schools in Walsall.

Built on the site of the former T. P. Riley Comprehensive School, it cost £23 million. A number of the teachers were carried over from T.P Riley School, while others were new recruits and a few were transferred from Thomas Telford School.

The current Head Teacher is Simon Rogers, who replaced Vivienne Evans. Evans replaced the first Head Teacher, Jean Hickman in September 2009. Rogers joined the school as Deputy Head before becoming the Head Teacher in April 2015. As with Thomas Telford, demand for places is high. In its first year of opening, there were 421 applicants for the 168 (raised to 192 due to demand) places on offer for Year 7 students. The number was subsequently reduced back to 168.

In 2009,it was the fifth-highest-ranking secondary school overall (and the second-highest-ranking state comprehensive) in the borough with 61% of GCSE students gaining 5 A*-C grades.

References

External links
 Official Walsall Academy website 
 News article from its first day of opening

Academies in Walsall
Secondary schools in Walsall
Educational institutions established in 2003
2003 establishments in England